Plagiarism is the 17th album by American rock band Sparks. It is a tribute album of sorts featuring new alternate versions of some of their best known songs.

Release
Plagiarism was not successful across Europe like its predecessor Gratuitous Sax & Senseless Violins, and did not chart significantly in any territory. The two singles performed well enough to register in the lower regions of the UK Singles Chart. The first single from the album, "The Number One Song in Heaven", included the vocals of Jimmy Somerville and reached #70 in October 1997. Remixes of the single reached the US Billboard Hot Dance Music/Club Play chart (and currently their final entry) in 1999 at #28. The second single; "This Town Ain't Big Enough for Both of Us" did better, and was buoyed by the presence of Faith No More, it peaked at #40 (and remains Sparks last UK top 40 entry) in December 1997.

Track listing

Personnel
 Russell Mael – vocals, production, mixing
 Ron Mael – keyboards, production
 Metro Voices – vocal backing on "Pulling Rabbits Out of a Hat", "When Do I Get to Sing 'My Way'", "The Number One Song in Heaven" and "Never Turn Your Back On Mother Earth"
 Dean Menta – guitar on "Funny Face"
 Tony Visconti – orchestral, choral arrangements and conducting on "Pulling Rabbits Out of a Hat", "This Town Ain't Big Enough for Both of Us", "When Do I Get to Sing 'My Way'", "Change", "Something for the Girl with Everything", "Propaganda", "The Number One Song in Heaven" and "Never Turn Your Back On Mother Earth"
 John Thomas – mixing
 Greg Penny – mixing
 Eskimos and Egypt – additional production, remix, bass, guitar and drums on "Angst in My Pants"
 Faith No More – production and performer on "This Town Ain't Big Enough for Both of Us" and "Something for the Girl with Everything"
 Erasure – production and performer on "Amateur Hour"
 Jenny O'Grady and David Porter-Thomas – additional vocals on "Propaganda"
 Jimmy Somerville – performer on "The Number One Song in Heaven"

References

Sparks (band) albums
1997 albums
Roadrunner Records albums
Oglio Records albums
Albums arranged by Tony Visconti
Albums conducted by Tony Visconti